Ernest Grafford Peart (May 11, 1918 – April 24, 1981) was a Jamaican politician and diplomat.

From 1959 to 1971 he was Member of the Parliament of Jamaica for the People's National Party, Western Manchester Parish constituency. In 1962 he was elected with 8561 votes. While an MP, he sat on the Parliamentary Public Accounts Committee.

In 1972 he was appointed Minister of Labour, followed by Minister of Works from 1976 to 1978. From   to  he was High Commissioner (Commonwealth) in London.

References 

1918 births
1980 deaths
Government ministers of Jamaica
High Commissioners of Jamaica to the United Kingdom